David E. Rowe (born August 11, 1950) is an American mathematician and historian. He studied mathematics and the history of science at the University of Oklahoma, and took a second doctorate in history at the Graduate Center of the City University of New York. He served as book review editor, managing editor, and editor of the journal Historia Mathematica. In 1992, Rowe was appointed Professor of History of Mathematics and Natural Sciences at the Johannes Gutenberg University in Mainz where he presently teaches. His research has mainly focused on mathematics in Germany, but in recent years he has been concerned with Albert Einstein's general theory of relativity and the broader cultural and political impact of Einstein's ideas. As part of this effort, he and  have co-edited a source book entitled Einstein on Politics: His Private Thoughts and Public Stands on Nationalism, Zionism, War, Peace, and the Bomb, published by Princeton University Press in 2007.

Publications

References

External links
 Personal Homepage: www.DavidERowe.net
 Homepage at the Universität Mainz

Academic staff of Johannes Gutenberg University Mainz
American historians of mathematics
Graduate Center, CUNY alumni
University of Oklahoma alumni
Living people
21st-century American historians
21st-century American male writers
1950 births
American male non-fiction writers